The  2009 Beijing Guoan F.C. season  was the 6th consecutive season in the Chinese Super League, established in the 2004 season, and 19th consecutive season in the top flight of Chinese football. They competed at the Chinese Super League and AFC Champions League.

First team
As of August 30, 2009

Friendlies

Mid–season

Competitions

Chinese Super League

Matches

AFC Champions League

Group stage

References

Beijing Guoan F.C. seasons
Chinese football clubs 2009 season